The 2004–05 Polish Basketball League was the 77th edition of the top basketball league of Poland.

Teams

The first 10 teams will play in Era Basket Liga in the next season:
 Idea Śląsk Wrocław
 Prokom Trefl Sopot
 Anwil Włocławek
 Polonia Warbud Warszawa
 Gipsar Stal Ostrów Wlkp.
 Unia Wisła Paged Tarnów
 Arcus Detal-Met Notec Inowrocław
 Czarni Słupsk
 Ostromecko Astoria Bydgoszcz
 AZS Gaz Ziemny Koszalin
Last 2 teams are dropped from EBL
 Start Lublin
 Spojnia Stargard Szczeciński
Teams promoted to EBL
 Turów Zgorzelec
 SKS Starogard Gdański

League table

Ineligible for playoffs

Playoffs

External links
Polska Liga Koszykówki - Official Site 
Polish League at Eurobasket.com

Polish Basketball League seasons
Polish
Lea